There She Is!! (Korean: 떳다 그녀!!) (also known as Tteot-ta geu-nyeo or Tteotta or Ddautta) is a South Korean Flash cartoon series produced by a three-person team and hosted on the Korean website SamBakZa. The cartoons became particularly popular during the spring of 2004 when they were exposed to American and European audiences. The series is originated from Comic strip 'One day' (Korean: 어떤날) which has been published from November 2000 until March 2002 on Braille newspaper 'Newspaper that we read together' (Hangul: 함께 읽는 신문) that is published by Korean newspaper Hankook Ilbo. The series is noted for its classic manhwa style elements and its high-quality animation. The first There she is!! generated a large amount of positive feedback from its online audience, including fan art, which drove SamBakZa to produce more cartoons in the series.

The plot of the series is the romance between an anthropomorphic bunny and cat, in a world where such relationships are taboo. At the 2004 Anima Mundi animation festival in Brazil, this video won first place in both the Web Animation - Professional Jury and Web Animation - Audience divisions, as well as winning the Special Award Anima Mundi Web.

Distribution rights to the series are licensed to Gyeonggi Digital Contents Agency (GDCA).

SamBakZa have moved to the Production Support Center located in Gyeonggi-do Bucheon-si on 2008. SamBakZa have also stated they may be setting up a registration system in the future on their main page, and will send emails to members when new episodes are released to the public.

Since July 2014, all five episodes have remained in the top 20 of Newground's Best of All time with the original 'There She Is!!' holding the first-place position.  Combined, the series has been viewed over thirteen million times on Newgrounds.

Characters 

Doki: Doki (도키, cf. Korean word tokki 토끼 "rabbit") is a female rabbit who is madly in love with Nabi and considers everyone to be her friends. Although very loving and cheerful, she is somewhat obsessive and willing to go to extremes to get what she wants. She has a habit of befriending animals and putting green ribbons, similar to that of Nabi's, around their necks or tails.

Nabi: Nabi  (나비, cf. Korean word goyang'i 고양이, "kitty") is a male cat as well as Doki's love interest in the story. He is reluctant to return Doki's love at first, finding her antics annoying and fearing the social repercussions, but grows to tolerate and eventually reciprocate it. He wears a green scarf and seems to have some skill in martial arts. In Step 3 it is shown that he works as a paperboy. Nabi translates to "butterfly", and is a common name for a pet cat in South Korea.

Jjintta Set: The Jjintta Set (찐따 세트 Jjintta Seteu, translating as "Moron Set") is a gang of three roughneck, shaggy male cabbits. The three are brothers, the children of a female rabbit and a male lion. They appear as minor antagonists in the second episode, but slowly develop a friendship with Nabi. Their members include:

 Il-ho (일호, "Number One"), the leader of the group, and also firstborn. He has a rather fierce rivalry with Nabi and is extremely protective of Doki. In episode 2 He misunderstands that Nabi was forcing her in a relationship, but realizes otherwise later. In episode 5, He gives Nabi a ticket to "Paradise" albeit reluctantly. In the episodes it is unclear what motivates his behavior, but in 2016 the creator shared that Il-ho's motivation is his parentage.
 Yi-ho (이호 Iho, "Number Two"), who wears an eye patch and has a crush on the keyboardist, Pi. The second eldest brother.
 Sam-ho (삼호, "Number Three"), who wears a medical mask and appears to be less coordinated than the other members of the gang. The youngest brother.

Band: While the website's profile does not give any information about them, they are present in Step 2. The band consists of Pi, a female cat keyboardist; and a male rabbit guitarist named Moon

Red Eyes A tall male bunny wearing sun glasses, and artist. He was originally created as an antagonist.

Hana: Hana (하나, translating as "One" or common name in Korea.) is a female cat, and the apparent owner of the band. She is shown to be very kind, especially towards Doki and Nabi, and has a loving trust in her bodyguard, Pizza.

Pizza: Pizza (피짜, Pijja) is a large male cat, and Hana's bodyguard. He has a noticeable scar over his right eye, but its origin is unknown.

Gray Rabbit: Gray Rabbit (회색 토끼 Hoisaek Tokki, literally Gray Rabbit) is a large male rabbit who is in love with Hana. He is often depicted holding a bouquet of flowers. Works as an electrical engineer.

Step one: "There She Is!!" 

The first animation in the series was released on the SamBakZa website on April 20, 2003. Its soundtrack is the Korean ska song "There she is!!" (떳다! 그녀!!) by Witches (위치스).

The plot revolves around Doki, a female rabbit, meeting, falling in love with, and chasing Nabi, a male cat, in a world where love between the two species is socially unacceptable. The theme of the short is that all love can be accepted and has a chance. Nabi attempts to cure Doki's infatuation for him, but after seeing the extent of her love, he gives in and finds something he can appreciate in her.

A version with English titling was published in 2004 to high acclaim. The characters names were not disclosed until 2006, in preparation for the last three steps.

"There She Is!!" was nominated for both the Professional Award and the Cyber Jury Award at the Anima Mundi Web Festival in Rio de Janeiro, Brazil in 2004.  It won both categories.

Step two: "Cake Dance" 

The second short in the series,  "Cake Dance" (떳다 그녀!! step 2. - 케이크 댄스), was released on the SamBakZa website on February 25, 2005.  Its soundtrack is the Korean pop song "Happy Birthday to Me" by Bulldog Mansion.

Like its predecessor, it is carried by classic manhwa style elements, but also includes considerable amounts of full-animation action. Nabi carries Doki's birthday cake across various obstacles including a gang of rabbits, the Jjintta Set, who attack him out of Yi-ho's mistaken belief that Nabi forced Doki into the relationship.

It is also worth noting that near the end of the short, Doki and Nabi (as well as the rest of the party) are ejected from the café, after Doki publicly shows affection for Nabi. The owner of the cafe clearly shows a bias against inter-species relationships, by displaying an "anti-intermarriage" sign on the door. This foreshadows some of the events which occur in step four of the series. In the end, Nabi runs into a younger female rabbit, whom the viewer is led to believe is in the same predicament that Nabi was in when the episode began, and he offers to help her safely navigate the streets with her cake (likely the same little girl who runs past in the very first  scene, being teased by a rabbit boy with a fish, probably making fun of her for liking a cat).

Easter eggs 

If one clicks on the fish in the moon during the stampede scene, the original comic starring Doki and Nabi (titled "Only You") followed by thanks from the creator will appear.  This is only in the English version of the short; the Korean version displays what appears to be a snapshot of an animation panel in Flash, presumably from step two.

The flying fish on the moon is a reference to another SamBakZa animation, Hot Fish, in which Doki and Nabi make an appearance. This is currently officially unavailable due to copyright issues with the soundtrack, "Sera" by Jeo Qu-cheon. However, it is available on YouTube.

The signs on the walls of the subway station read "Bulldog Mansion". Clicking on them will give a link to their (now defunct) site.

Step three: "Doki and Nabi" 

Step three begins an in-depth trilogy of sequels to the first two videos. It premiered at SICAF (Seoul International Cartoon & Animation Festival) on May 21–25, 2008, and was posted online on May 30. Its soundtrack is the Korean pop song "3차성징" (Sam-cha Seong-jing, translating to "tertiary sex characteristic") by T.A.COPY.

This step portrays Doki and Nabi's first date. Nabi begins as an unwilling recipient of Doki's love, but starts to reciprocate as the date goes on. The Jjintta Set and their objections are upset when Doki tackle-hugs Il-ho, then turning the hug into something akin to a nelson. In the end, Nabi asks Doki out on a second date, and their relationship blossoms into a mutual romance, and they share their first kiss. The intermarriage theme is more prominent in this episode, as are the consequences of their relationship: the step ends with a rock thrown through Nabi's window.

Easter eggs 

Clicking the cloud on the top right of the loading screen triggers an alternate opening that focuses on Doki making her way to Nabi's house. Clicking the black poster during the scene with the neighbors opens T.A.COPY's site in another window.

The scene where Doki befriends the hedgehog is a nod to Hayao Miyazaki's Nausicaä of the Valley of the Wind, in which Nausicaä tames Teto the fox-squirrel.

During the scene where Doki is chasing Nabi, after all attempts to capture Nabi fail, Doki throws a Poké Ball at Nabi's head. Also referenced just prior is the Chain Mine, as used by the MS18E Kampfer, in the series Mobile Suit Gundam 0080: War in the Pocket.

Step four: "Paradise" 

The fourth short, "Paradise", was released August 20, 2008. Its soundtrack is the Korean rock song "Wolsik" by Tabu from the album, A Lunar Eclipse.

In this step, the protagonists deal with social revolt over intermarriage as Doki is attacked by an angry mob. She attempts to flee until her pet hedgehog turns to meet her pursuers. Doki goes back to save it, but is hurt and hospitalized. Fearing that intermarriage opponents will injure Doki further, Nabi abruptly ends the relationship, displaying an anti-intermarriage sign on his door. Doki considers asking him to come with her to "Paradise" (implied to be a location that accepts intermarriage), not noticing Il-ho spying on her. Il-ho confronts the detached Nabi to literally knock some sense into him, but his action sparks an attack by intermarriage supporters who assume he is viciously attacking Nabi. Il-ho turns to leave and finds intermarriage opponents in the way. Frustrated, he blindly punches through the crowd, only to hit his brother Yi-ho by mistake. This provokes a riot between intermarriage supporters and opposers.

As the fight fades, we see Doki standing and crying over her hedgehog, which has stopped breathing and presumably died. Doki tries to contact Nabi, who can't answer since he was arrested alongside Il-ho during the riot. Assuming Nabi is not interested in a relationship with her, Doki loses all hope. She drops her cellphone from the roof of her apartment building and decides to leave for "Paradise".

Much darker in character than the previous episodes, this episode is primarily in black and white, with only Nabi's trademark green scarf, Doki's blushing cheeks and trademark pink bow, and the numerous intermarriage protest signs portrayed in color. As the episode progresses, Nabi's scarf gradually fades in color; when he breaks off the relationship with Doki, his scarf has completely faded to grey. In this use of colour imagery, the influence of SamBakZa's new sponsors and the increase in their technical ability can be seen. Toward the end, Doki's trademark pink bow and cheeks also fade to gray as she loses all hope of Nabi ever loving her.

It was revealed on Newgrounds that the author thought that people would not like this part of the series because it was too serious.
But, in the end it was also accepted by the Newgrounds audience, receiving a large number of views.

Final step: "Imagine" 

The final step of There She Is!! debuted on December 9, 2008 with the rest of the series at Joongang Cinema along with other various short flash animations. The website crashed after its release due to unexpected demand.  Its soundtrack is the song "Imagine" by Brunch.  The introduction features a rearrangement of the traditional English song Greensleeves called "Greensleeves to a Ground", due to its reference to the colour green and the relevance of the lyrics.  The end credits feature an arrangement of the music from the original "There She Is!!"

In this step, Doki ties a green ribbon around a tree branch and leaves for "Paradise".  Nabi, after his release from custody, sits down on a bench next to the vending machines where he first met Doki (which are now heavily vandalized).  Next to him, a small yellow bird abandoned by its owner wanders off.  Nabi saves the bird from a car and they arrive at the tree where Doki tied her ribbon. As the wind blows, Nabi sees dozens of green ribbons tied to the branches, representing the hope and wishes of the people wishing for change. (In Asia, tying a ribbon to a tree and making a wish is how you pray to the gods.) Realizing that he isn't alone in his belief that cat/rabbit love should be accepted, Nabi begins to pursue Doki, his scarf regaining its green colour.

As Nabi is running to the airport, he comes upon another faceoff between the pro- and anti-intermarriage groups. The pro-intermarriage leader sees him and, believing Nabi to be charging the anti-intermarriage group, leads his group into an attack. Nabi is thrown into another riot when the anti-intermarriage group charges.  The Grey Rabbit finds Nabi and tries to grab him, but is unsuccessful; this is when Doki's animals charge in, scaring the crowd and promptly ending the riot.  Nabi is shown running through the gap, and as he clears the riot, an anti-intermarriage protester is shown falling in love with a pro-marriage member after falling into her arms, depicting a moment of hope for the pro-intermarriage cause. Nabi meets the Jjintta Set on a bridge and Il-ho presents him Doki's second ticket to Paradise, implying that he wants Nabi to join her on the trip.  Nabi promptly rips it in two, showing his resolve to stay and fight. Seeing Nabi's change of heart, the Jjintta Set escort him to the airport, with Nabi hitching a ride on Il-ho's motorcycle.

Along the way, a traffic light begins to turn red. Realizing that this will delay Nabi, Yi-ho pulls ahead and deliberately crashes his motorcycle, forcing the oncoming traffic from both sides to stop. Yi-ho shows joy for what he did, but a police-cat on a police cycle passes him, pursuing the bikers. Il-ho notices the police-cat in the rearview mirror, as Sam-ho pulls up offering to beat up the cop with a baseball bat and a chain, much to the annoyance of Il-ho. As Il-ho and Nabi continue on, Hana and Grey Rabbit pull up beside them in Hana's convertible. After Nabi is lifted into the car by Grey Rabbit, Hana contacts her bodyguard Pizza, who is already at the airport.

At the airport, Pizza protects Doki from demonstrators on both sides as Nabi arrives. Nabi is confronted by the anti-intermarriage symbol behind Doki, which flickers into a pro-intermarriage sign, representing the fighting protestors. Nabi ignores the signs and the demonstrators and embraces Doki out of love, destroying the arguments of both sides (symbolized by the holographic signs disintegrating). After their reunion, the couple dodge thrown debris with dance-like motions reminiscent of Doki's daydreams in the first animation.  As the couple leaves the airport, hope is given for cat/rabbit relationships: Hana smiles at Grey Rabbit's offer of flowers, while a blushing (and injured) Yi-ho is supported by Pi, the feline keyboardist (and Pizza uses a demonstrator's head to wipe egg off of his hand).

As the song draws to a close, Nabi and Doki clean graffiti off the vending machines where they first met, ending with a toast between them. Nearby, the tree that had once been covered in green ribbons now has green leaves budding, signifying that the people's dreams are starting to become a reality.

Another Step

On January 12, 2016, after HD versions of the original five episodes had been uploaded to YouTube, SamBakZa had launched an Indiegogo Campaign (since funded) in order to help fund a new episode of There She Is. The new Episode will primarily feature the Jjintta-set, the three scruffy bunnies, and will explore their origins and why they ultimately decided to help Doki and Nabi find their love. The final step officially aired on August 18, 2020 on Newgrounds for three days for a fee. It was later released on DVD in 2021. Copies of the DVD were first distributed to the Indiegogo Campaign's supporters, and later in May 2021 was made available for purchase via SamBakZa's online store. Amalloc has said that some of the scenes of the film will be released on YouTube in 2021.

Plot
As Doki and Nabi leave the airport, protestors on both sides follow them. Il-ho watches this from the overpass and flashes back a childhood memory where he is abused and beaten by students at school; his mother, a rabbit, attempts to comfort him, but he storms away and his lion father roars at him for his disrespectful attitude. In the present, at the Jjintta Set's home, Il-ho, still upset about this memory, orders Pi to leave. When Il-ho tries to force her out, Yi-ho fights him, but gets defenestrated into an anti-cat/rabbit protest banner outside.

In an alley, Yi-ho assaults an anti-cat/rabbit protestor, having become part of an extremist group based in a junkyard for which he shaved his ears to reveal their long, pointy shape inherent in cabbits. An anti-cat/rabbit cat protestor is chased by a large rabbit and barges into the music club where Pi's band is performing. When the rabbit grabs and punches him in front of the crowd, Pi gets offstage to rebuke the attacker, but stops when she sees the entire club showing her the pro-cat/rabbit symbol on their phones. Frustrated, she attempts to fight the rabbit, but is stopped by Yi-ho as the rabbit drags the incapacitated cat out of the building.

Il-ho and a wedding dress-clad Doki wait at a mountain shrine to take a photo with Nabi, but witness him being chased by protestors on his way there. Doki offers Il-ho tickets to their wedding, but Il-ho warns that their offspring will face discrimination. Doki instead sees her and Nabi having many children and cats, rabbits, and cabbits living together in harmony, to which the newly arrived Nabi overhears and blushes. Pi appears and leads Il-ho to the junkyard, where Yi-ho and his gang are rounding up and imprisoning anti-cat/rabbit protestors.

Il-ho, Sam-ho, and Pi arrive at the junkyard to confront Yi-ho. During the ensuing battle, they free the captives but cause an excavator to lose its balance. With it about to fall onto Yi-ho, Il-ho saves him by throwing him out of its way and roaring at the freed anti-protestors, with a large apparition of his father's roaring head materializing behind him. The excavator falls and crushes Il-ho. As Yi-ho grieves, Sam-ho, alongside the protestors and anti-protestors, rush to lift the excavator, allowing Yi-ho to pull Il-ho out from under it. The injured Il-ho playfully slaps him in the face, and Pi tackles Yi-ho to the ground in a loving embrace.

Merchandising

Several requests have been made for various There she is!! merchandising, such as T-shirts and DVDs. SamBakZa have not made anything available, although they have indicated that a DVD is forthcoming. amalloc announced on April 4, 2012 that a There She Is!! DVD is being produced with modified scenes and may contain TSI comic strips. The project was suspended due to Amalloc's other works, though he said that he is still planning to work on the project.

References

External links 
SamBakZa Homepage
There she is!! Homepage
SamBakZa on Newgrounds
SamBakZa on Twitter
Doki's Facebook
Nabi's Facebook

Flash animated films
South Korean animation
Films about couples
Films about discrimination
Animated films about cats
Animated films about rabbits and hares
Flash animated web series